Margaret Belemu (born 24 February 1997) is a Zambian footballer, who plays as a right back for Turkish Super League club Hakkarigücü Spor and the Zambia women's national team.

Club career 
In September 2022, Belemu moved to Turkey and joined Hakkarigücü Spor to play in the 2022–23  Super League.

International career 
Belemu competed for Zambia at the 2018 Africa Women Cup of Nations, playing in three matches.

References 

1997 births
Living people
Sportspeople from Lusaka
Zambian women's footballers
Women's association football fullbacks
Zambia women's international footballers

Red Arrows F.C. players
Footballers at the 2020 Summer Olympics
Olympic footballers of Zambia
Expatriate women's footballers in Zambia
Zambian expatriate sportspeople in Turkey
Expatriate women's footballers in Turkey
Turkish Women's Football Super League players
Hakkarigücü Spor players